154th meridian may refer to:

154th  meridian east, a line of longitude east of the Greenwich Meridian
154th meridian west, a line of longitude west of the Greenwich Meridian